Ailsa Shipbuilding Company was a Scottish shipbuilding company based in Troon and Ayr, Ayrshire.

History
The company was founded in 1885 by Archibald Kennedy, 3rd Marquess of Ailsa, along with Peter James Wallace and Alexander McCredie.

In 1902 the Ailsa yard fitted out the polar exploration ship  for the Scottish National Antarctic Expedition of 1902–04. The Scotia sailed from Troon for the South Atlantic on 2 November 1902.

The company built paddle steamers for various companies around the UK, including the New Medway Shipping Company's PS Medway Queen, the only estuary paddle steamer left in the UK.

During the Second World War, Ailsa built vessels for the Navy, including several s.

In 1977 Ailsa was nationalised and subsumed into the British Shipbuilders Corporation. In 1981, the assets of Ailsa and those of Ferguson Brothers were merged to form Ferguson-Ailsa, Limited. This grouping was split and privatised in 1986, the Ailsa yard being acquired by Perth Corporation as Ailsa & Perth, Limited.

Ailsa stopped large-scale shipbuilding in 1988 and finally closed as a shipbuilder in 2000. The yard has recently been used for ship repair work and the fabrication of large concrete sections for a pier improvement programme in Grimsay, Western Isles.

Ships built by Ailsa Shipbuilding Company

Archives
The Ailsa Shipbuilding Company archives are maintained by the University of Glasgow Archives Services.

References

Defunct shipbuilding companies of Scotland
Former defence companies of the United Kingdom
Companies based in South Ayrshire
1885 establishments in Scotland
Manufacturing companies established in 1885
British companies established in 1885
Troon
British Shipbuilders